Kapaemahu is a 2020 animated short film produced and directed by Hinaleimoana Wong-Kalu, Dean Hamer and Joe Wilson with director of animation Daniel Sousa. It is based on the long-hidden history of four healing stones on Waikiki Beach placed there as a tribute to four legendary mahu who first brought the healing arts to Hawaii. The film is narrated in Olelo Niihau, the only unbroken form of the Hawaiian language. Kapaemahu premiered at the Tribeca Film Festival, was screened in over 160 film festivals and 200 theaters worldwide, won multiple Oscar-qualifying jury awards, and was shortlisted for Best Animated Short Film at the 93rd Academy Awards®.

Production 

The film was conceived in 2010 when Wong-Kalu introduced Hamer and Wilson to the stones of Kapaemahu, which she had known since childhood, while they were filming her in Waikiki for the documentary Kumu Hina. Recognizing the potential of the site to act as a monument to Hawaiian concepts of healing and gender diversity, the team began researching the history of the stones, which had long been hidden from the public.  This led to the discovery of the first recorded version of the oral tradition, a handwritten manuscript in the archives of the University of Hawai'i that became the basis for the film script. It was decided to narrate the film in Olelo Niihau, which is the only form of Hawaiian spoken continuously since prior to Western contact and closest to the language that would have been spoken by the healers.  Sousa developed a hand-painted art style and palette for the project that is rooted in the Polynesian art forms of tapa making and lauhala weaving.

Release and Reception 
The film world premiered at the 2020 Tribeca Film Festival, where it was awarded the Special Jury Mention. It received favorable reviews from several critics.  Sharmindrila Paul of AnimationXpress wrote “ The film looks like poetry in motion.  The animation technique is unique and evokes a feeling of witnessing the legend and its history in person”. It was characterized by Animation Magazine as “a vivid animation seen through the eyes of a child,"  by Filmmaker Magazine as a "rich standout,"  by Zippy Frames as a "thoughtful film about connecting the past to the future, inviting understanding, and executed in a uniquely empathetic way," and by IndieWire as "a transgender, Hawaiian breakthrough."

Book, Exhibion & Documentary 

The animated film was used as the basis for a children's picture book called Kapaemahu published by Penguin Random House.  It was also used as the primary storytelling device for the moolelo in a  PBS documentary film and an immersive multimedia exhibition at the Bishop Museum, both titled The Healer Stones of Kapaemahu.

Selections and Awards

References

External links

 Kapaemahu Channel on Vimeo

American LGBT-related films
Films set in Hawaii
Hawaiian-language films
Transgender in Oceania
LGBT Native Hawaiian culture
Films set in the Pacific Ocean
LGBT-related animated films
2020 short films
2020 animated films
2020 LGBT-related films
Films by indigenous directors
Indigenous films
2020s American films